The John Rankin House at 440 Clinton Street at the corner of Carroll Street in the Carroll Gardens neighborhood of Brooklyn, New York City was built in the Greek Revival style in 1840, at which time it stood by itself, surrounded by farmland and overlooking Upper New York Bay.

Rankin was a merchant, and the mansion, one of the finest Greek Revival houses in the city, was one of the largest residences in Brooklyn in the 1840s.  It is a three-story, square brick building on a stone foundation.  The interior features a massive mahogany stairway with paneled wainscotting.

It was designated a New York City landmark in 1970, and was added to the National Register of Historic Places in 1978. Currently it is the F. G. Guido Funeral Home.

References
Notes

External links

Houses on the National Register of Historic Places in Brooklyn
New York City Designated Landmarks in Brooklyn
Greek Revival architecture in New York City
Greek Revival houses in New York (state)
Houses completed in 1839
Carroll Gardens, Brooklyn